Sue Windels (born July 11, 1946) is an American politician who served in the Colorado House of Representatives from the 27th district from 1999 to 2001, and in the Colorado Senate from the 19th district from 2001 to 2009.

References

1946 births
Living people
Democratic Party members of the Colorado House of Representatives
Democratic Party Colorado state senators
20th-century American politicians
20th-century American women politicians
21st-century American politicians
21st-century American women politicians
People from Nampa, Idaho
Women state legislators in Colorado